Wake Island Airfield  is a military air base located on Wake Island, which is known for the Battle of Wake Island during World War II. It is owned by the U.S. Air Force and operated by the 611th Air Support Group. The runway can be used for emergency landings by commercial jetliners flying transpacific routes and has been used in the past by airlines operating jet, turboprop, and prop aircraft on scheduled flights.

As of 2018, four active duty Air Force airmen and around 100 contractors were stationed at Wake Island, supporting refueling stops and missile defense system development and testing. The airfield can support about twice as many personnel during transpacific military deployments.

History

Seaplane base 
The first intention to build an air base surfaced in 1935, when Pan American World Airways (PAA) selected Wake Island as an intermediate support base for their seaplane routes to the Far East, especially the Philippines. A year prior, jurisdiction over Wake Island was passed to the Navy Department, which cooperated with PAA in updating topographical surveys, due to the potential military value of having a suitable mid-Pacific air base. It was a key element in the first South Pacific air ferry route to be used in flying aircraft from the U.S. to the Philippines. With the war, that route through the Japanese administered islands of the central Pacific was not possible, and Wake, along with the next stop, Guam, were lost, forcing the development of the route skirting Japanese held areas.

Between 5 and 29 May 1935, Pan American's air base construction vessel, North Haven, landed supplies and equipment on Wilkes Islet for eventual rehandling to Peale Islet which, because of its more suitable soil and geology, had been selected as the site for the PAA seaplane base. By the time of North Haven's return to Wake, after a month's voyage westward to Manila, the project was well underway, and, three months later, on 9 August 1935, a Pan American Sikorsky S-42 flying boat made the first aerial landing at the atoll.

From 1935 until 1940, when two typhoons swept Wake with resultant extensive damage to the now elaborately developed Pan American facilities, development and use of the base were steady but uneventful. A hotel was built, farm animals imported, and hydroponic truck farming commenced.

Naval air station 
The seaplane base on Peale Island was too limited to support realistic military activity on the atoll, thus supporting plans for developing a full-scale military air base with a runway for land-based aircraft. This advanced detachment established a naval air station on Wake Island. Construction plans included a runway to be used by F4F Wildcat airplanes and commercial airliners of greater size, which couldn't land on water. Support craft arrived at Wake on 9 January 1941, laid to off Wilkes Islet, and the next day commenced landing naval supplies and advance base equipment for the development of the base. The company contracted to build the base was Morrison-Knudsen Co. (later acquired by Washington Group International) which, together with seven other companies, built many of the U.S. naval bases throughout the Pacific Ocean. During the construction, several military personnel were already deployed. The Battle of Wake Island began nearly a year later. Wake Island was held by Japan until September 1945.

Postwar service

In 1950, Wake Island was a stop on Pan Am's round-the-world service between San Francisco and New York City, with the airline operating double-decker Boeing 377 Stratocruiser propliners into the airfield.  Westbound Pan Am flights continued on to Guam, Tokyo, and other destinations in Asia before proceeding to Europe and New York City while eastbound flights operated a Henderson Field (Midway Atoll)-Honolulu-San Francisco routing.

During the Korean War, the airfield was the site of a face-to-face meeting between President Harry Truman and General Douglas MacArthur in October 1950, which presaged Truman's dismissal of MacArthur in April 1951.

By 1969, Wake Island was a scheduled stop on a round trip transpacific flight operated by Pan Am between San Francisco and Saigon in the former country of South Vietnam. This passenger service was operated twice a week with a Boeing 707 intercontinental jetliner.  These flights also served Honolulu and Guam nonstop from Wake Island. 

At the same time, Pan Am was operating daily all cargo flights into Wake Island with a Boeing 707 jet freighter.  Depending on the day of the week, this all cargo service was flown into Wake Island on a westbound route that included New York City, Los Angeles, Travis Air Force Base in northern California (which was a flag stop for military cargo and mail), San Francisco and Honolulu.  The Pan Am 707 jet freighter was continuing all cargo service, westbound to Guam, Tokyo, Saigon, and Hong Kong. 

Pan Am subsequently discontinued all flights into Wake Island by the early 1970s, thus ending many years of passenger and cargo air service. Wake Island was one of the smallest destinations, population-wise, to receive scheduled Pan Am jet service. A Pan Am 747 visited the airfield in November 1985 on a transpacific tour to commemorate the first China Clipper flight.

Japan Airlines (JAL) used both Wake Island and Honolulu as stops on its initial Tokyo-San Francisco service using Douglas DC-6 prop aircraft in the mid-1950s.  The Wake Island technical stop on this route disappeared with the introduction of Douglas DC-8 jetliners by JAL.

British Overseas Airways Corporation (BOAC, which subsequently became British Airways) also used Wake Island as a refueling stop.  During the late 1950s, BOAC operated Bristol Britannia turboprop aircraft on their twice-a-week westbound service between the U.K. and Asia via the U.S.  The routing of these flights was London-New York-San Francisco-Honolulu-Wake Island-Tokyo-Hong Kong.  The Wake Island stop was discontinued when BOAC replaced the Britannia propjet with Boeing 707 aircraft on the same route as part of their around-the-world services.

Transocean Air Lines, a U.S. air carrier based in Oakland, California, was operating Lockheed Constellation propliner service into the airport in 1958 on a routing of Oakland-Honolulu-Wake Island-Guam-Okinawa with round trip flights being operated twice a week.

Real Transportes Aereos, a Brazilian airline, also used the airfield as a technical stop for its flights between South America and Japan during the early 1960s.  In 1961, Real was operating weekly Douglas DC-6B round trip service with a routing of São Paulo-Rio de Janeiro-Manaus-Bogota-Mexico City-Los Angeles-Honolulu-Wake Island-Tokyo.

Another airline that operated on Wake Island was Philippine Airlines with Douglas DC-8 jetliners on a daily westbound service from San Francisco and Honolulu to Manila during the early 1970s. The airfield was a technical stop for fuel for this Philippine Airlines flight as the DC-8 did not have the range to fly nonstop from Honolulu to Manila.

Super typhoon Ioke

On 31 August 2006, the super typhoon Ioke (class 5) struck Wake Island. Significant damage was expected to all structures and infrastructure, including the runway. Members of the 36th Contingency Response Group at Andersen Air Force Base in Guam were estimating large costs to repair the airfield facility. On 8 September 2006, 16 members of the Group arrived at Wake to make the initial assessments and found that the runway and taxiways were still in an acceptable operational condition, with just a requirement to clear debris. Other structures were damaged and were repaired in five days. With the base up and running again, another 53 members arrived by air to support continued reconstruction.

Airlines and destinations

References

External links
 CIA World Factbook
 GlobalSecurity.org
 Pacific Island Travel
 Pacific Wreck Database

Wake Island
Airports in the United States Minor Outlying Islands
Fields of the United States Air Force
Battle of Wake Island